Game of the Year may refer to: 

 Video Game of the Year – see List of Game of the Year awards
 Board Game of the Year – see List of Game of the Year awards (board games)